The Amsterdam International Motor Show or AutoRAI was a motor show that took place every two years in Amsterdam, Netherlands. The history of the AutoRAI goes back to 1893, when the bicycle exhibition was established. The first RAI exhibition was organised there in 1895.

History
In 1900, the auto industry started to operate in the Netherlands and so the Association Bicycle & Automotive (RAI) was born. Prior to 1961, the RAI was situated in a building on the Ferdinand Bolstraat in Amsterdam (the 'Oude RAI') for forty years. In the 1970s through the 1990s, AutoRAI served an important function as a European event in a country with very little car industry of its own. Japanese manufacturers thus had a neutral ground (away from the spotlights of Geneva) where they could be expected to make their European premieres of cars already shown at home. The AutoRAI was usually held in February, giving the Japanese four months to develop European market models after the common October (Tokyo Motor Show) premieres of Japanese automobiles.

AutoRAI 2013, which was scheduled to take place in April 2013, was cancelled. The organisers made the decision after consultation with the RAI Association and major car brand importers. The economic developments in the automotive sector had made it impossible to organise a fully-fledged event. The aforementioned parties said they would now focus on possible new setups of the event in the future. In addition to AutoRAI, the AutovakRAI 2013 was also cancelled for the same reasons. After a 2015 edition was organized, it was announced on August 31 2015 that the 2017 edition would be cancelled again due to insufficient space reservation by manufacturers. According to the RAI press release, it seems that they do not plan to organize any more AutoRAI events.

2011
 Audi Q3
 Burton Electric
 Donkervoort D8 GT 24H of Dubai
 ECE Qbee
 Ford Focus 1.6 TDCi ECOnetic
 Isis AM01
 Jaguar XF (facelift)
 Landwind CV9
 Opel Astra GT
 Škoda Octavia 1.4 TSI Greentech

2009
 Alfa Romeo MiTo Linea Rossa
 Ford Focus X Road
 Savage Rivale Roadyacht GTS
 Westfield 1600 Sport Turbo

2007

 C,mm,n 2.0 Concept
 Fiat Scudo Panorama Executive B2B Concept
 Mercedes-Benz CL 65 AMG
 Suzuki Grand Vitara Bandit Concept

2005
 Donkervoort D8 270 RS
 Renault Laguna Hatchback
 Wiesmann GT
 MG TF
 MG TF GT (Coupe)
 MG SV

2003
 Mercedes-Benz E-Class Combi
 Mercedes-Benz SL 600
 Opel Astra 1.3 CDTi
 Smart City Coupe facelift
 Toyota Yaris facelift
 Toyota Yaris Verso facelift
 Volkswagen Touran
 Volvo S80 facelift

2001
 Mercedes-Benz C-Klasse Combi
 Mercedes-Benz C-Klasse C 32 AMG
 Mercedes-Benz SLK 32 AMG
 Spyker C8 Laviolette
 Suzuki Grand Vitara XL-7

1999
 Alfa Romeo 145 and 146
 Audi S3
 Chevrolet Alero
 Daihatsu Gran Move
 Opel Vectra
 Porsche 911 GT2
 Renault Megane Break

1997
 BMW 5 Series Touring
 Jeep Cherokee 2.5 TD
 Jösse Car Indigo 3000
 Mazda 323P
 Mercedes-Benz CLK-Class (C208)
 Mitsubishi Galant

1995
 Daihatsu Cuore (export model premiere)
 Daihatsu Valera
 Ford Escort facelift
 Ford Galaxy
 Mitsubishi Carisma
 Rover 100 facelift
 Rover 600 620 Di
 Suzuki Baleno 3-door
 Volkswagen Sharan

1993
1993 was the largest Amsterdam show to date, with the original single hall now being the centre of a much bigger exhibition. There were also more new car presentations than usual for Amsterdam, headlined by the all new Peugeot 306.
 Jaguar XJ12 (XJ81)
 Mitsubishi Galant Hatchback
 Peugeot 306
 Toyota Carina E
 Volvo 850 Estate

1991
 Audi 100
 De Tomaso Pantera facelift
 Fiat Croma facelift
 Hyundai Lantra
 Lancia Dedra Turbo
 Lancia Dedra Integrale
 Maserati 222 SR
 MAX Pick-Up
 Škoda Favorit Estate (Forman)
 Yue Loong Feeling

1989
 MAX Roadster 205

1987
 Ford Sierra Sedan
 Hyundai Pony 3-door
 Opel Omega 3000
 Mazda 929
 Nissan Micra 5-door

1985
 BMW M5
 MAX Roadster
 Renault Alpine GTA

1983

 Opel Tech 1 concept car
 Honda Prelude

1981
 Suzuki Alto SS80 (European premiere)

1979
 Honda Prelude (world premiere)
 Datsun Cherry (variant of the earlier "Nissan Pulsar")
 Suzuki SC100 (bigger-engined export variant of the "Suzuki Cervo")

1967
 Ford Cortina Estate
 Pontiac Firebird

1965
 Alfa Romeo Giulia Sprint GTA

1963
 DAF 33 Combi

1958
 DAF 600

1948
 Gatso 4000 Aero Coupé
 Land Rover Series 1

References

External links
 

Auto shows
Automotive industry in the Netherlands